William Forrester may refer to:

 William Forrester (racecourse owner) (1842–1901), Australian racehorse and racecourse owner
 William Forrester (politician) (1855–1926), member of the House of Commons of Canada
 William Forrester (footballer, born 1869) (1869–?), English footballer
 Will Forrester (born 2001), English footballer
 William Ray Forrester (1911–2001), law school dean
 Bill Forrester (born 1957), American swimmer
 William Forrester, the character played by Sean Connery in the film Finding Forrester